Vanbrugh may refer to:

 Irene Vanbrugh, English actress
 John Vanbrugh, English playwright and architect
 Philip VanBrugh, naval commander
 Violet Vanbrugh, English actress
 Vanbrugh College, York, a college of the University of York
 RTÉ Vanbrugh Quartet, a European string quartet